Following is an alphabetically arranged list of valleys in Pakistan. A large part of Pakistan is within the broad Indus valley.

Azad Kashmir
 Bagh Valley
 Bandala Valley
 Banjosa Valley
 Bhana Valley
 Jhelum Valley
 Kas Chanatar Valley
 Leepa Valley
 Neelam Valley
 Pathika Valley
 Samahni Valley
 Shounter Valley
 LoraLund Valley

Balochistan
 Chamman Valley
 Moola Valley
 Quetta Valley
 Urak Valley

Gilgit-Baltistan
 Bagrot Valley
 Chiporsun Valley
 Chitral Valley
 Chorbat
 Gilgit Valley
 Pak Walldi
 Gorikot Valley
 Haji Gham Valley
 Hispar Valley
 Hopar Valley
 Hunza Valley
 Hushay Valley
 Ishkoman Valley
 Khaplu Valley
 Kharkoo Valley
 Kunar Valley
 Nagar Valley
 Naltar Valley
 Rupal Valley
 Shigar Valley
 Shimshal Valley
 Skardu Valley
 Thagus Valley
 Thalay Valley
 Yasin Valley
Ghursay valley
Doyan valley

Khyber Pakhtunkhwa
 Allai Valley
 Bahrain Valley 
 Baroghil Valley
 Battagram Valley
 Biori Valley
 Bumburet Valley
 Chitral Valley
 Gabina Jabba Valley 
 Gabral Valley 
 Jarogo Valley 
 Kalam Valley
 Kalash Valleys
 Kaghan Valley
 Khanki Valley
 Khot Valley
 Konsh Valley
 Kurrum Valley
 Kumrat Valley
 Madyan Valley 
 Mankyal Valley 
 Marandeh Valley
 Marghazar Valley 
 Miandam Valley 
 Miranzai Valley
 Palas Valley
 Panjkora Valley
 Rumbur Valley
 Shaikhdara Valley
 Shinkari Valley
 Siran Valley
 Swat Valley
 Tikri Valley
 Tirat Valley
 Tirah Valley
 Tochi Valley
 Ushu Valley  
 Utror Valley

Punjab
 Phugla Valley
 Soan Sakaser Valley
 Soon Valley

See also 
Tourism in Pakistan
Hill Stations in Pakistan
Lakes of Pakistan
Waterfalls of Pakistan

External links
 valleys in Pakistan by 
 [Pakistan guide] by 

Pakistan

Valleys